Léonie Banga-Bothy is a Central African politician who served as Minister of Foreign Affairs of the Central African Republic from 2013 to 2014.

Banga-Bothy was appointed as Minister of Foreign Affairs by Michel Djotodia in June 2013. She was succeeded by Charles-Armel Doubane in April 2016.

References

Living people
21st-century women politicians
Foreign ministers of the Central African Republic
Women government ministers of the Central African Republic
Year of birth missing (living people)
Central African Republic women diplomats
Female foreign ministers